Koothattukulam is a town and municipality situated in Muvattupuzha taluk, towards the south east corner of Ernakulam district in Kerala State, India.  It lies at the junction of three districts: Ernakulam, Kottayam and Idukki, and covers an area of 2318.71 hectares. It is located in the foothills of the Western Ghats and is included in the areas forming "Keezhmalanad".

See also
 History of Koothattukulam

References

Cities and towns in Ernakulam district